Johannes Pieter "Jan" Pronk Jr. (born 16 March 1940) is a retired Dutch politician and diplomat of the Labour Party (PvdA) and activist.

Pronk studied Economics at the Rotterdam School of Economics obtaining a Master of Economics degree and worked as a researcher at his alma mater and the Economics Institute from July 1960 until May 1971 and was also was active as a political activist in the New Left movement. After the election of 1971 Pronk was elected as a Member of the House of Representatives on 11 May 1971 and served as a frontbencher and spokesperson for Development Cooperation. Pronk was also selected as a Member of the European Parliament on 13 March 1973 and dual served in both positions. After the election of 1972 Pronk was appointed as Minister for Development Cooperation in the Cabinet Den Uyl taking office on 11 May 1973. The Cabinet Den Uyl fell on 22 March 1977 just before the end of its term. After the election of 1977 Pronk returned as a Member of the House of Representatives serving from 8 June 1977 until his resignation on 8 September 1977 before returning on 16 January 1978 as a frontbencher and spokesperson for Development Cooperation and Agriculture and Fisheries. In July 1980 Pronk was nominated as Assistant Secretary-General of the United Nations Conference on Trade and Development (UNCTAD) taking office on 18 August 1980. After the election of 1986 Pronk returned to the House of Representatives on 3 June 1986 serving again as a frontbencher. After the election of 1989 Pronk was again appointed as Minister for Development Cooperation in the Cabinet Lubbers III taking office on 7 November 1989. After election of 1994 Pronk continued his office in the Cabinet Kok I. After election of 1998 Pronk was appointed as Minister of Housing, Spatial Planning and the Environment in the Cabinet Kok II taking office on 3 August 1998. In October 2001 Pronk announced that he wouldn't stand for the election of 2002 and declined to serve in new cabinet position.

Pronk continued to be active in politics and in August 2002 was appointed as Special Envoy of the United Nations for the Earth Summit 2002 serving from 1 September 2002 until 31 December 2002, and also worked as a distinguished professor of International Development at the International Institute of Social Studies from January 2003 until July 2010. In June 2004 Pronk was nominated as the first Special Representative of the United Nations in Sudan serving 1 July 2004 until 10 December 2006.

Pronk retired from active politics at 66 and became active in the public sector as a non-profit director and served on several state commissions and councils on behalf of the government. Following his retirement Pronk continued to be active as an advocate and activist for Human rights, the Anti-war movement, Social justice and for more European integration. He holds the distinction of as the second longest-serving cabinet member since 1850 with 17 years, 114 days.

Early life
Jan Pronk was born in Scheveningen in the Netherlands on March 16, 1940. He is the son of Johannes Pieter Pronk Sr. (1909–2005) and Elisabeth Hendrika van Geel, who were both school teachers at the Protestant elementary school Koningin Emmaschool in Scheveningen. Jan Pronk attended the Koningin Emmaschool for three years. He attended the Protestant secondary school Zandvliet Lyceum in the Hague, where he graduated the gymnasium in 1958 with a curriculum that focused on exact sciences.

Jan Pronk continued to study economics at the Netherlands School of Economics (currently Erasmus University Rotterdam, Erasmus School of Economics) in Rotterdam, graduating in 1964. As a student, he worked as a guide on the Henri Dunant, the Dutch Red Cross's holiday ship for the disabled. He was a member of the Christian-Historical Youth Organisation, the youth organisation of the conservative Protestant Christian Historical Union party and president of the Protestant fraternity S.S.R.

In 1965 Pronk became research-assistant of professor Jan Tinbergen, the future Nobel Prize laureate, at the Centre for Development Planning and later he became associate professor at the Dutch Economic Institute. In this period he also became an active member of the social-democratic PvdA, between 1966 and 1971 he was chairman of the Krimpen aan de Lek-branch of the party. He became active in the development cooperation-movement, serving as chairman of the "X-Y"-movement: an alternative Dutch development cooperation fund.

Politics

Netherlands (1971–1977)
In 1971 Pronk was elected to the House of Representatives for the Labour Party. He was shadow minister for development cooperation in the leftwing shadow cabinet of PvdA, D66 and PPR. He served secretary of the committee Mansholt, a committee of these three parties on the implications of the Limits to Growth-report for the Netherlands. He was re-elected in 1972. In 1973 he became Minister of Development Cooperation in the cabinet Den Uyl. He changed the development cooperation-policy of the Netherlands, giving it a political goal: the equal distribution of power and wealth in the world. The development cooperation policy became oriented towards the New International Economic Order, in which developing countries would become self-reliant. In 1975 1,5% of the domestic product was spent on development aid. His proposal to include communist states as Cuba and North Yemen as recipient countries of Dutch development aid, led to some controversy, but he put his proposal through. His policy supported liberation movement in Southern Africa. His leftwing policy put him at odds with the more moderate PvdA Minister of Foreign Affairs Max van der Stoel. As Minister for Development Cooperation, Pronk held several prominent positions in international organizations: between 1973 and 1977 he was Deputy Governor of the World Bank. Because of his many international travels, he often fell asleep at Cabinet meetings, which lasted until very late in the night.

United Nations (1977–1986) 
In 1977 he returned to Parliament. He combined this period in Parliament with several posts in the world of development cooperation: in 1979 he also became Professor of International Development at the Institute of Social Studies; he was a member of the committee "Church Participation in Development" of the World Council of Churches and of the Councils Commission of Advisors on Economic Affairs; he was a member of the International Commission for the Study of Communication Problems of UNESCO; and in the Netherlands he was member of the Council for Government and Social Affairs of the Dutch Reformed Church. In 1978 he became Knight in the Order of the Netherlands Lion. In 1980 he left Parliament to become Assistant Secretary-General of the UNCTAD. In 1985 he was Assistant UN Secretary-General.

Return to the Netherlands (1986–2002) 
Pronk was re-elected to Parliament in 1986. In 1987 he was elected vice-chair of the PvdA, after first considering running for chair. In 1987 he was co-writer of the report "Moving Panels" in which the PvdA moderated its policies. In 1989 he combined his work as MP with a position as professor at the University of Amsterdam, where he occupied the Joop den Uyl chair, created by the scientific foundation of the PvdA. Although he was originally asked to become Minister of Defence, he returned to the post of development cooperation in the third Lubbers cabinet in 1989.  During his period as Minister for Development Cooperation he sought to combine economic and social development, with environmental protection. As Minister for Development Cooperation he again became deputy governor of the World Bank. In 1992 his criticism of Indonesian government's record on human rights, caused the Indonesian government to refuse development aid from the Netherlands and to conclude the long-standing international aid coordination arrangements, chaired by The Netherlands, which had been maintained since the late 1960 through the Inter-Governmental Group on Indonesia. In 1993 he was asked to become Deputy UN Secretary-General, but he declined. After the 1994 elections he remained Minister for Development Cooperation, now in the first Kok cabinet.

In 1998 he again became a minister in the second cabinet Kok but he switched to Minister of Housing, Spatial Planning and the Environment. During this period he focused on sustainable development. In 2000 a fire works depot exploded in the neighbourhood of Enschede. As minister he was responsible for this event, although there was considerable controversy surrounding the disaster he did not step down. In 2000 he was the Dutch candidate for the post of High Commissioner for Refugees, a post which was taken by another Dutchman, former prime minister Ruud Lubbers. In 2000 and 2001 he chaired the UN climate conference, where parties agreed upon a compliance mechanism for the Kyoto protocol for the reduction of greenhouse gases. In 2002 when the report on the Dutch involvement in the Srebrenica massacre was published, it became clear that the Dutchbat peacekeeping force had been unable to prevent the massacre. On April 10, Pronk announced that he would step down as minister because he felt politically responsible. On April 16, the entire Kok second Cabinet stepped down.  In 2002 the Labour Party lost half its seats; Pronk was re-elected to Parliament, but he refused the position because he wanted new faces to enter Parliament. In December 2002, he became Officer in the Order of Orange-Nassau.

Return to the United Nations (2002–2006)

Since 2002 Pronk has held several positions in the United Nations.

In 2002 he came Special UN envoy to the World Summit on Sustainable Development in Tokyo. He moderated discussions on water, hygiene, the environment and biodiversity. In 2003 he chaired the Water Supply and Sanitation Collaborative Council.

In 2003 he returned to the Institute of Social Studies as professor theory and practice of development cooperation. Pronk still holds several posts in Dutch civil society. In 2004 he came into conflict with minister Verdonk (Migration & Integration), because he characterized the way she sent asylum-seekers out of the country as "deportation".

In June 2004 Pronk was appointed UN Special Representative for Sudan by United Nations Secretary-General Kofi Annan

On September 21, 2006, Pronk asked the warring parties in Darfur, including President Omar al-Bashir and the seven rebel movements, to observe a "month of tranquility" during Ramadan, which would begin September 23, 2006. His implicit call for a ceasefire in the western region of Sudan came after the Khartoum government withdrew its ultimatum for African Union peacekeepers to pull out. Other African states then agreed to extend their mandate until the end of 2006. By Pronk's request, they would finish the collision course, which would mean no fighting, no bombing, no changes of heart. Such a lull would help "create an atmosphere" for a new round of negotiations. The peace deal was "in a coma": not dead but dying. In addition the rejectionist factions should end the quarrel to start talking about everything related to the Darfur peace agreement to improve it.

In mid-October 2006, the army of Sudan accused Pronk of "waging psychological warfare on the armed forces" and demanded his deportation after Pronk published thoughts on army military defeats in his weblog.  On 22 October, the Sudanese government gave Pronk three days' notice to leave the country. He left Sudan the next day (October 23) when UN Secretary General Kofi Annan recalled him to New York for consultations. On October 27 the UN Security Council and UN Secretary General Kofi Annan announce that Pronk will serve out his last months as Special Representative of the Secretary-general in Sudan.

Pronk's story roughly parallels that of Mukesh Kapila, a previous UN employee who was forced to leave Sudan after making critical comments about the Darfur conflict.

Labour Party (2007–2013)
Jan Pronk was a candidate for the election of the chairman of the Dutch Labour Party (PvdA). As a candidate he wanted the party to return to a more leftwing course. He lost the election, between September 16 and September 23, 2007, to Lilianne Ploumen.

On 28 May 2013, Jan Pronk publicly announced he is ending his membership of the Labour Party.

Public perception 
During his political life, Pronk was known as principled politician. Prime Minister Kok called him the "Minister for the national conscience". Because he was minister for over 17 years, he came to be known as "minister by profession".

Other positions
Pronk is a member of the Governing Council of Interpeace, an international peacebuilding organization. He is also a supporter of the Campaign for the Establishment of a United Nations Parliamentary Assembly, an organisation which campaigns for democratic reform in the United Nations, and the creation of a more accountable international political system.

Private life
Pronk is married to Tineke Zuurmond. They have two grown children, a daughter Carin and a son Rochus. In 1984 Pronk gave up alcohol in one day and became an avid runner.

Decorations

Honorary doctorates
Jan Pronk has two honorary degrees and he is member of five chivalric orders. A full list of all his honorary decorations:
Doctor honoris causa (1974), San Marcos University, Peru
Doctor honoris causa (2002), Institute of Social Studies, Netherlands
The International Institute of Social Studies (ISS) awarded its Honorary Doctorate to Jan Pronk in 2002.

References

External links
Official

  Prof.Dr. J.P. (Jan) Pronk Parlement & Politiek

 

 

 
 

 
 

1940 births
Living people
Cold War diplomats
Dutch development economists
Dutch anti–nuclear weapons activists
Dutch anti-war activists
Dutch democracy activists
Dutch expatriates in Belgium
Dutch expatriates in France
Dutch expatriates in the United States
Dutch expatriates in Switzerland
Dutch human rights activists
Dutch humanitarians
Dutch lobbyists
Dutch nonprofit directors
Dutch nonprofit executives
Dutch officials of the United Nations
Dutch social justice activists
Erasmus University Rotterdam alumni
Academic staff of Erasmus University Rotterdam
Knights of the Order of the Netherlands Lion
Labour Party (Netherlands) politicians
Members of the House of Representatives (Netherlands)
Ministers for Development Cooperation of the Netherlands
Ministers of Defence of the Netherlands
Ministers of Housing and Spatial Planning of the Netherlands
MEPs for the Netherlands 1958–1979
Independent politicians in the Netherlands
International relations scholars
Inter-Governmental Group on Indonesia
Peace and conflict scholars
Protestant Church Christians from the Netherlands
Academic staff of the University of Amsterdam
Officers of the Order of Orange-Nassau
Officiers of the Légion d'honneur
Special Representatives of the Secretary-General of the United Nations
Diplomats from The Hague
20th-century Dutch diplomats
20th-century Dutch economists
20th-century Dutch educators
20th-century Dutch male writers
20th-century Dutch politicians
21st-century Dutch diplomats
21st-century Dutch economists
21st-century Dutch male writers
21st-century Dutch politicians